Heart and Soul is the eighteenth studio album by American country music artist Ronnie Milsap, released in 1987. The album produced four singles, three of which claimed the top spot on the Billboard country singles chart" "Snap Your Fingers"; "Make No Mistake, She's Mine," a duet with Kenny Rogers; and "Where Do the Nights Go." Two other singles, "Old Folks," a duet with Mike Reid; and "Button Off My Shirt" peaked at #2 and #4 respectively on the country charts. "Button Off My Shirt" was also recorded that same year by Mike + The Mechanics & Ace vocalist Paul Carrack for his solo album "One Good Reason".

Heart & Soul reached #13 on Country album charts. Allmusic described it as "one of Milsap's more diverse efforts."

Track listing

Personnel

 Ronnie Milsap – lead vocals, backing vocals, keyboards, electric piano (5)
 Mitch Humphries – keyboards
 Clayton Ivey – keyboards, acoustic piano (5)
 Shane Keister – keyboards, synthesizer sequencing, keyboard bass, drum programming
 Hargus "Pig" Robbins – keyboards
 Jay Spell – keyboards
 Mark Casstevens – acoustic guitar
 Don Potter – acoustic guitar
 Chet Atkins – acoustic guitar (3)
 Larry Byrom – electric guitar
 Jon Goin – electric guitar
 Bruce Dees – electric guitar (5), backing vocals
 Steve Lukather – electric guitar (7)
 Jerry Douglas – dobro (1)
 Lloyd Green – steel guitar
 Bob Wray – bass guitar (1-4, 6-9)
 David Hungate – bass guitar (5)
 Larrie Londin – drums
 Tom Roady – percussion
 Terry McMillan – harmonica
 Jim Horn – saxophone
 Bergen White – horn arrangements
 David T. Clydesdale – string arrangements (5)
 Sherilyn Huffman – backing vocals
 Lisa Silver – backing vocals
 Suzy Storm – backing vocals
 Diane Tidwell – backing vocals
 Marie Tomlinson – backing vocals
 Barbara Wyrick – backing vocals
 Kenny Rogers – lead and harmony vocals (5)
 Mike Reid – lead and harmony vocals (10)

Production
 Producers – Rob Galbraith and Kyle Lehning (all tracks);  Ronnie Milsap (Tracks 1-4 & 6-9).
 Engineers – Joe Bogan, Ben Harris and Kyle Lehning.
 Assistant Engineer – Randy Gardner 
 Mastered by Doug Sax at The Mastering Lab (Hollywood, California).
 Art Direction – Mary Hamilton 
 Design and Illustration – Dennas Davis

Chart performance

Album

Singles

References
Ankeny, Jason. [ Heart & Soul], Allmusic.

1987 albums
Ronnie Milsap albums
RCA Records albums